Lee Shaner (born July 8, 1981), better known by his stage name Intuition, is an American rapper based in Los Angeles, California. He is also the host of the music podcast Kinda Neat.

Early life 
Intuition was born Lee Shaner on July 8, 1981. He grew up in North Pole, Alaska. At the end of 1990s, he moved to Los Angeles, California.

Career 
Intuition released his first solo album, Stories About Nothing, in 2007. In 2009, he collaborated with rapper VerBS for the Buzz EP. His second solo album, Girls Like Me, was released in 2010. It featured a guest appearance from Slug, and it was almost entirely produced by Equalibrum. In 2014, he released Intuition & Equalibrum, a collaborative album with producer Equalibrum.

In 2013, he started the music podcast, Kinda Neat, which features artist interviews and live performances. In 2018, Complex included it on the "25 Essential Podcasts for Music Lovers" list.

Discography

Studio albums
 Stories About Nothing (2007)
 Girls Like Me (2010)
 Intuition & Equalibrum (2014)

Compilation albums
 I Ruined These Songs for You (2010)
 I Ruined These Songs for You Too (2011)

EPs
 Buzz (2009)

Singles
 "Sanctuary" (2011)
 "Imagining" (2013)

References

External links
 
 

1981 births
Living people
American male rappers
Rappers from Los Angeles
21st-century American rappers
21st-century American male musicians